Jenny Tseng (Yan Nei; born Yan Suk Si; 20 February 1953) is a singer from Macau. She is best known in Cantonese-speaking regions, and she has been based in Hong Kong for much of her career.

Personal life
In 1987, Tseng gave birth to her daughter "甄家平 (Melody)", which caused controversy and speculation as to the identity of the father. Tseng later revealed that her daughter was conceived via artificial insemination, using the stored sperm of her late husband, Alexander Fu Sheng.

Awards won

RTHK Top 10 Gold Songs Awards
1972–1982: 每年的金骆驼 

1978: 明日话今天 (The Female Artist of the Year award did not exist at this time)

1979: 春雨弯刀

1981: 東方之珠, and Female Singer of the year

1983: 世間始終你好

1984: 再度孤獨

1986: 海上花

Jade Solid Gold Best Ten Music Awards Presentation

1984: 再度孤獨, 無敵是愛 with Sam Hui, Female Artist of the year

2011: Golden Needle Award (金針獎)

References
 – Translated

External links

 Alexander Fu Sheng: Biography of the Chinatown Kid

1953 births
Living people
Cantopop singers
20th-century Hong Kong women singers
Hong Kong Mandopop singers
Macau people
Macau-born Hong Kong artists